Okore is a surname. Notable people with the surname include:

Jores Okore (born 1992), Danish footballer
Nnenna Okore (born 1975), Nigerian-Australian artist
Sheaffer Okore, Kenyan politician

See also
Okoro